Dorpenomloop Rucphen is a men's one-day cycle race which takes place in the Netherlands and was rated by the UCI as 1.2 and forms part of the UCI Europe Tour.

Winners

References

Cycle races in the Netherlands
Recurring sporting events established in 1974
1974 establishments in the Netherlands
Cycling in Rucphen
UCI Europe Tour races